Liga Española de Baloncesto Aficionado (EBA), commonly known as Liga EBA, is a Spanish basketball championship that is the fourth tier level in the Spanish basketball league system, after the Liga ACB, LEB Oro, and LEB Plata. It is administered by the FEB. It was previously the Spanish second tier level competition from 1994 to 1996, the third tier level from 1996 to 2000, and the fifth tier level, from 2007 to 2009.

The Liga EBA is made up of five inter-regional groups.

After the regular season, sixteen teams advance to the playoffs, where only four teams are promoted to the LEB Plata. The lowest ranked teams of each group, are relegated to the Primera División.

Current clubs

Conference A

Conference B

Conference C

Conference D

Conference E

History

Final Eight Format
The best teams in the Final Eight were usually promoted to a higher division. Due to economic problems, sometimes the winners couldn't be promoted to higher divisions.

Final groups format
The 16 qualified teams were divided in four groups of four teams. The winners of the regular season groups hosted each group. The four group winners were promoted to the disappeared LEB Bronce.

After the play-offs, the FEB set a table to determine the official champion of the Liga EBA. In this table, the four group winners were the four first qualified teams, the runners-up from 5th to 8th, third qualifiers from 9th to 12th and last teams from 13th to 16th.

'May madness' format
The 32 qualified teams played a two-leg play-off where four teams were promoted to the higher division. From the 2010–11 season, only 16 teams qualified for the 'May madness' format. Four teams were promoted each season to LEB Plata. For the 2012–13 season, FEB decided to return to the Final Groups format.

After the play-offs, the FEB set a table to determine the official champion of the Liga EBA.

Comeback to the Final groups format
As in 2008 and 2009, the final round was played by 16 teams divided in four groups, where the winners were promoted to LEB Plata. Since the 2018–19 season, teams were divided into two stages for six promotions.

Copa EBA
The Copa EBA was a competition held from 1996 to 2000 season. This cup was held after the end of the regular season and was played by the champions of the groups.

External links
 Spanish Basketball Federation Official Website
 Liga EBA History

 
4
Fourth level basketball leagues in Europe